The Rupelo Formation is an Early Cretaceous (Berriasian) geologic formation in the Burgos Province of Castile and León in northern Spain. The formation crops out near the municipality Mambrillas de Lara in the northwesternmost part of the Cameros Basin in the Sierra de la Demanda.

Fossil sauropod tracks have been reported from the formation. The formation was deposited under lacustrine conditions in a shallow carbonate lake, with some exposure events in the sedimentary sequence. Imprints of dinosaurs were made in carbonate mud, after they were infilled with marl. Dinosaur tracks have been assigned to sauropods, theropods and ornithopods. An indeterminate titanosauriform sauropod humerus (MDS-VPCR, 214) has been found in the formation.

The municipality of Mambrillas de Lara has created a dinosaur park.

Correlation

See also 
 List of dinosaur-bearing rock formations
 List of stratigraphic units with sauropodomorph tracks
 Sauropod tracks

References

Bibliography

Further reading 
 

Geologic formations of Spain
Lower Cretaceous Series of Europe
Cretaceous Spain
Berriasian Stage
Mudstone formations
Lacustrine deposits
Ichnofossiliferous formations
Paleontology in Spain
Geography of Castile and León